CBD Belapur is a railway station on the Harbour Line of the Mumbai Suburban Railway network. It serves the Central Business District of Navi Mumbai. Around 50,000 people travel towards CST and 15,000 travel towards Panvel every day.

When constructed it was the largest station complex in Navi Mumbai. It also has a provision for landing of helicopters on the deck.

References

External links 
 Mankhurd - Belapur Railway project

Railway stations in Thane district
Mumbai Suburban Railway stations
Mumbai CR railway division
Transport in Navi Mumbai